Daegu FC (Korean: 대구 FC) is a South Korean professional football club based in Daegu. The club was founded as a community club at the end of 2002, and made their K League 1 debut in 2003. Daegu has played mostly in the K League 1 but was relegated at the end of the 2013 season to the K League 2. They were promoted back to the top tier for the 2017 season and went on to win the Korean FA Cup in 2018, which qualified them for the 2019 AFC Champions League. The club's best season in K League 1 was in 2021, when they finished third out of twelve teams. The same year, they were also runners-up of the Korean FA Cup and made it to the Round of 16 in the 2021 AFC Champions League.

History

Foundation
Daegu FC was established in 2002 as a community club (generally in South Korea, a "community-club" means that the club issues shares) based in the city of Daegu. The city is a key shareholder, and the current mayor is chairman of the club. Following their foundation, the club entered the 2003 season of the K League under manager Park Jong-hwan. Park had previously managed the national side for a number years in the 1980s and 1990s. The club's entry, together with that of Gwangju Sangmu, brought the number of teams participating in the league to 12.

Domestic competitions
Daegu finished the 2003 K League season in 11th place (out of 12 teams), winning seven games, and drawing sixteen. In the 2003 Korean FA Cup, Daegu reached the quarterfinals, where they were defeated 1–0 by Ulsan Hyundai Horang-i. Daegu improved in 2004 to tenth place in the league which, due to Incheon United's entry, now numbered 13 clubs. In the FA Cup, Daegu were knocked out in the round of 32 by National League side Ansan Hallelujah. In the Samsung Hauzen Cup, a new cup competition run as a league competition specifically for K League clubs (thus excluding National League and lower tier clubs) during the K League's mid-season break, finished eighth out of 13 teams. The following season saw Daegu placed eighth place in the league and seventh in the Samsung Hauzen Cup. In the FA Cup, after defeating University and National League sides, Daegu were knocked out in the quarterfinals in a 2–1 loss to another K League side, the Chunnam Dragons.

For the 2006 K League season, the club placed seventh overall in the league and was 13th in Samsung Hauzen Cup. It reached the quarterfinals of the 2006 edition of the FA Cup but lost (again) to the Chunnam Dragons. Following completion of the 2006 season, Park Jong-hwan stepped down as manager after four years with the club. On 1 December 2006, Byun Byung-joo was appointed as the new manager. A former South Korean international, Byun had no previous K League management experience prior to his appointment as Daegu FC's manager. The club's performance slipped in comparison to its previous two seasons, and it placed 12th. The club failed to get out of the group stage in the 2007 Samsung Hauzen Cup and achieved a similar level of performance in the FA Cup, where Daegu lost to Incheon United in the round of 16.

In 2008, Daegu played extremely aggressive football, becoming the joint equal top-scoring team of the K League, alongside Suwon Samsung Bluewings. However, they also conceded the most goals in the league. An 11th place in the K League standings was the eventual outcome. For the first time in its history, Daegu reached the semi-finals of the Korean FA Cup, by defeating Ulsan in the quarterfinals, following a win in the round of 16 over Ansan Hallelujah. However, they then lost to their opponents Pohang Steelers in a 2–0 loss. The club placed fifth (out of six teams) in their group in the Samsung Hauzen Cup.

The 2009 season was one of the worst in the club's history. In a now expanded league of 15 clubs, thanks to new entrant Gangwon FC, Daegu would place in the last, 15th place, winning only five games. In the FA Cup, Daegu reached the quarterfinals, against Daejeon Citizen, the game finished with a 1–1 scoreline. Daegu lost out in the subsequent penalty shootout. In the league cup, now known as the Peace Cup Korea 2009, the club finished third in their group, one point away from qualifying for the knockout phase of the cup. Later in the year, Lee Young-jin was appointed as manager for the 2010 season. Lee, who has previously coached FC Seoul, replaced Byun who had resigned after being embroiled in a scandal involving a player's agent and payoffs for selecting specific players.

On field, Daegu repeated their dismal performances of the previous season, finishing 15th in the K League standings, equal with Gwangju Sangmu on points. Daegu conceded the most goals of any club in the league, losing 19 games out of 28 games, with five wins and four draws. In the FA Cup, Daegu lost 1–0 after extra time to the National League side Suwon City. Better results were achieved in the League Cup, with Daegu progressing out of their group to the knockout stage, thanks to wins over Daejeon Citizen and Busan, before losing to FC Seoul after a penalty shootout.

By virtue of winning the 2018 Korean FA Cup, Daegu qualified for its first appearance in the 2019 AFC Champions League.

After a controversial fall out with the club's executive director, Cho Kwang-Rae, its manager, André, left Daegu FC on January 27, 2020. On February 5, 2020, the club announced Lee Byung-keun, who had joined the club as the chief assistant coach at the beginning of 2019 season, as a caretaker manager to lead the club in the upcoming 2020 K League 1 season.

International competitions
Prior to the start of the 2006 K League season, Daegu participated in the Tongyeong Cup. The Tongyeong Cup was a four-team invitational tournament held in Tongyeong, South Korea. As well as Daegu and fellow K League club Incheon United, A-League side Queensland Roar and Beijing Guo'an were also part of the tournament. After beating both Incheon and Beijing, Daegu drew 0–0 with Queensland, winning the Tongyeong Cup and thus its first trophy.

In 2019, the club played in the 2019 AFC Champions League, and for the group stage was placed with Sanfrecce Hiroshima, Guangzhou Evergrande and Melbourne Victory. Despite having the lowest wage bill of all the K-League clubs, it won its first game, against Melbourne Victory. It went on to win two more games in the group stage but failed to progress to the knockout phase.

Stadium

The club's first home ground, Daegu Stadium (formerly Daegu World Cup Stadium), was opened on 28 June 2001 and is owned by the Daegu Metropolitan City. The stadium was one of the venues for the 2002 FIFA World Cup, hosting three group games, as well the 2002 FIFA World Cup play-off game for third place between South Korea and Turkey. Daegu FC used the stadium as their main venue between 2003 and 2018. The stadium has 66,422 seats, and it is covered by natural grass. The name was changed to Daegu Stadium on 5 March 2008. Occasionally, Daegu FC played its home games at the Daegu Civic Stadium.

In the 2019 season, Daegu FC relocated to the DGB Daegu Bank Park, a 12,415 capacity football-specific stadium built at the same location as the demolished Daegu Civic Stadium.

Players

Current squad

Out on loan

Retired number(s)

12 – Club Supporters (the 12th Man)
24 – Park Jong-jin

Captains

R-League
From 2008 to 2011, Daegu FC fielded a team in the R-League, established in 2000 for the reserve squads of the professional K-League clubs.  The National Policy Agency also entered a team in the league.  The league format provided for two groups of teams (six to eight in each group), each group member playing the others in the group, three or four times, depending on the number of teams in the groups. The top two teams in each group moved onto a playoff round although from 2010, the title was shared between the winners of each group.

In 2008, Daegu placed 7th out of the 8 teams in their group, winning three of 18 games.  They fared little better in 2009, finishing last in their group of five teams.  In 2010, Daegu's reserve squad only won one of their group games, while they drew two, and lost 11 times.  The side's return of 5 points saw it place 8th and last in their group. In 2011, the club improved to 5th in its group, with eight wins. It did not enter the 2012 edition of the competition.

U-18 (Hyunpung High School) squad
In 2008, Daegu FC established an under-18 side, to act as a development squad for the men's team.  This is essentially Hyunpung High School's senior football team, and as of 2009, plays in the U-18 Challenge League. The side is managed by former Daegu FC player Kim Hyun-soo.

Club officials
Chairman:  Hong Joon-pyo (Daegu mayor)
Executive director:  Cho Kwang-rae
Scout:  Sung Ho-sang

Coaching staff
Manager:  Choi Won-kwon
Goalkeeping coach:  Lee Yong-bal
Fitness coach & interpreter:  Lee Jong-hyun
Medical trainer:  Park Hae-seung,  No Hyeon-uk,  Lee Dae-gyun
Data analyst:  Park Jun-chul

List of managers

Honours

League 
 K League Challenge
Runners-up (1): 2016

Cups 
 FA Cup
Winners (1): 2018
Runners-up (1): 2021

Season-by-season records

Key
W = Winners
RU = Runners-up
SF = Semi-final
QF = Quarter-final
Ro16 = Round of 16
Ro32 = Round of 32
GS = Group Stage

AFC Champions League record
All results list Daegu's goal tally first.

Sponsors
Kit manufacturer
2003: Kappa
2004: Joma
2005–06: Kika
2007–08: Lotto
2009–10: Joma
2011–14: Hummel
2015–17: Kelme
2018: The Hump
2019–20: Forward Everywear
2021–present: GoalStudio

References

External links

Daegu FC official website 
Daegu FC at Soccerway.com

 
Association football clubs established in 2002
K League 2 clubs
Sport in Daegu
2002 establishments in South Korea
K League 1 clubs